Stoenești is a commune located in Giurgiu County, Muntenia, Romania. It is composed of three villages: Ianculești, Mirău and Stoenești.

References

Communes in Giurgiu County
Localities in Muntenia